Vadinsk is a rural locality (a selo) and the administrative center of Vadinsky District, Penza Oblast, Russia. Population:

References

Notes

Sources

Rural localities in Penza Oblast
Kerensky Uyezd
Vadinsky District